Saginaw Airport  was a public use airport located eight nautical miles (15 km) north of the central business district of Fort Worth, in Tarrant County, Texas, United States. The airport was named for the nearby city of Saginaw, Texas.

The airport is closed and was removed from FAA records between May and July 2009.

Facilities and aircraft 
It had one asphalt paved runway designated 18/36 which measured 2,600 by 30 feet (792 x 9 m).

For the 12-month period ending February 24, 1998, the airport had 2,050 general aviation aircraft operations, an average of 170 per month. At that time there were 40 aircraft based at this airport, all single-engine.

References

External links 
 Saginaw Airport (F04), Saginaw, TX at Abandoned & Little-Known Airfields
 Aerial image as of 1 February 2001 from USGS The National Map

Airports in Texas
Defunct airports in Texas
Buildings and structures in Tarrant County, Texas